Lancashire Teaching Hospitals NHS Foundation Trust is one of the United Kingdom's NHS Foundation Trusts.  It provides healthcare for people in the Preston area and surrounding area in northwest England.  The trust runs Royal Preston Hospital on the northern outskirts of the city in the Fulwood area and Chorley and South Ribble Hospital.

Trust
Besides being a major healthcare services provider to over 350,000 people the Foundation Trust also provides clinical education for Trust Staff and external delegates under the brand of "The Health Academy" in addition to teaching for medical students from the University of Manchester and University of St Andrews. 
Both Chorley and Preston Hospitals also provide training for student nurses from the University of Central Lancashire. In January 2015 the Trust started an arrangement to train 50 nurses a year at the University of Bolton who will be guaranteed jobs at the Trust. Their studies will be funded by Student loans.

The Trust is also involved in the education and training of Diagnostic Radiography undergraduates, from the University of Cumbria.

The Trust uses the Single Transferable Vote voting system to elect its Members' Council.

Performance

The trust expects to finish 2015-16 with a deficit of more than £45 million as a result of changes to the NHS tariff.

In March 2018 it was the third worst performer in England in A&E, with only 53.3% of patients seen within 4 hours.  In December 2019 it was the worst performing trust in England, with only 43.4% seen within 4 hours.

  Nursing staff at Chorley and South Ribble Hospital A&E department complained of having to work shifts of up to 17 hours and threatened to start finishing their shifts on schedule if the situation is not resolved. A&E consultants at Royal Preston Hospital wrote to the Board raised concerns over unsafe staffing and dangerous levels of overcrowding in the A&E department. The operations director and three divisional directors resigned in April 2018.  From January to March 2019 only 52% of patients in the two emergency departments were seen within 4 hours.  This was the worst performance in England. There were about 200 “trolley waits” where patients waited more than 12 hours to be admitted to a ward.

The trust consider themselves to be the leading provider of prostatectomies within the region, but the East Lancashire Hospitals NHS Trust challenged this in June 2015 by installing a da Vinci Surgical System at the Royal Blackburn Hospital.

In March 2022 it was reported that patients were routinely waiting more than 60 hours to be admitted to a ward from the accident and emergency department.

Chorley and South Ribble Hospital 

In March 2016 the trust decided to downgrade the Emergency Department in Chorley to the status of an urgent care centre, open from 8am to 8pm with an out of hours GP service overnight, because they were unable to attract sufficient medical staff. An ambulance will be stationed in Chorley so that patients can be rapidly transported to Preston. This is said to be a temporary move. In January 2017 the trust reinstated the ED at Chorley on a part-time 12 hour basis with the UCC operating 24/7 run by GTD healthcare.

See also
 List of hospitals in England
 List of NHS trusts

References

External links 
 Website for the trust
 The Health Academy Website

NHS foundation trusts
Organisations based in Lancashire
City of Preston, Lancashire
Health in Lancashire